Salvatore Costantino (11 January 1919 – 31 March 1973) was an Italian long-distance runner who competed at the 1936 Summer Olympics.

References

External links
 

1919 births
1973 deaths
Athletes (track and field) at the 1948 Summer Olympics
Italian male cross country runners
Italian male long-distance runners
Italian male marathon runners
Olympic athletes of Italy